Dolichoderus bispinosus is a species of ant in the genus Dolichoderus. Described by Olivier in 1792, the species is found in many countries, including Belize, Brazil, Colombia, Costa Rica, French Guiana, Guatemala, Guyana, Honduras, Mexico, Panama, Paraguay, Peru, Suriname, Trinidad and Tobago, Venezuela.

References

External links

Dolichoderus
Hymenoptera of North America
Hymenoptera of South America
Insects described in 1792